Achhruram Memorial College, also known as Jhalda College, was established in 1975. It  offers the general and honours degree courses in arts and science subjects. The college is located in front of the local mini town, Jhalda. It is affiliated to Sidho Kanho Birsha University.This college is accredited by NAAC.

Departments

Science
Chemistry
Physics
Mathematics
Botany
Zoology

Arts
Bengali
English
Sanskrit
Hindi
History
Geography
Political Science
Philosophy
Economics

Accreditation
The college is recognized by the University Grants Commission (UGC).

See also

References

External links
Achhruram Memorial College
Sidho Kanho Birsha University
University Grants Commission
National Assessment and Accreditation Council

Colleges affiliated to Sidho Kanho Birsha University
Educational institutions established in 1975
Academic institutions formerly affiliated with the University of Burdwan
Universities and colleges in Purulia district
1975 establishments in West Bengal